Qezlar Bolaghi (also Romanized as Qezlār Bolāghī) is a village in Qanibeyglu Rural District, Zanjanrud District, Zanjan County, Zanjan Province, Iran. At the 2006 census, its population was 68, in 13 families.

References 

Populated places in Zanjan County